The  was an infantry division of the Imperial Japanese Army. It was formed 28 February 1945 in Utsunomiya as a square division. It was a part of the 16 simultaneously created divisions batch numbering from 140th to 160th.

Action
The 151st division was assigned to 51st army in April 1945 and performed a coastal defense duties in Mito, Ibaraki until surrender of Japan 15 August 1945 without seeing an actual combat. 433rd infantry regiment was garrisoning Hitachi, Ibaraki, 434th and 436th - Hitachinaka, Ibaraki, and 435th infantry regiment - Kasama, Ibaraki.

See also
 List of Japanese Infantry Divisions

Notes and references
This article incorporates material from Japanese Wikipedia page 第151師団 (日本軍), accessed 13 July 2016
 Madej, W. Victor, Japanese Armed Forces Order of Battle, 1937–1945 [2 vols], Allentown, PA: 1981.

Japanese World War II divisions
Infantry divisions of Japan
Military units and formations established in 1945
Military units and formations disestablished in 1945
1945 establishments in Japan
1945 disestablishments in Japan